Reimund Gerhard (born 31 May 1952 in Heidelberg) is a German applied physicist and university professor. Between 1979 and 2006 he used the last name "Gerhard-Multhaupt".

Education
Gerhard graduated from the Technical University of Darmstadt as Diplom-Physiker in 1978 and was a research student with Martin M. Perlman (1930–2013) in 1978/79. In 1984, he obtained his Ph.D. with Gerhard M. Sessler at the Technical University of Darmstadt.

Career
From 1985 until 1994, Gerhard was scientist and project manager at the Heinrich-Hertz-Institut fuer Nachrichtentechnik (now Fraunhofer Institute for Telecommunications) Berlin in the department led by Gerhard Mahler. In 1994 and 1996, he was appointed university professor for sensorics and for applied condensed-matter physics, respectively, at the science faculty of the University of Potsdam.

From 1997 until 2000, Gerhard served as director of the institute of physics and astronomy, from 2006 to 2008 as vice dean, and from 2008 to 2012 as dean of the faculty of science at the university. Between 2004 and 2012, he chaired the joint board of the master-of-science program in polymer science at the four universities with science faculties in Berlin and Potsdam. Since 2014, he has been a member of the university senate in Potsdam. He has undertaken visiting appointments at Bell Laboratories in Murray Hill, NJ, USA (1981, 1982, 1983), at the Tongji University in Shanghai, China (1987 and 1989), at the École Normal Supérieure (ENS) in Cachan, France (1995/96 and 2014/15), at the University of São Paulo (USP) in São Carlos, Brazil (1999, 2005–06, 2012), at the École Supérieure de Physique et de Chimie Industrielles (ESPCI) in Paris, France (1999), at the Hebrew University of Jerusalem, Israel (HUJI) (2013) and at the Xi'an Jiaotong University (XJTU) in Xi'an, China (2015).

Gerhard served as secretary of the 5th IEEE International Symposium on Electrets (ISE) in Heidelberg (1985), co-chair of the 7th IEEE International Symposium on Electrets (ISE) in Berlin (1991), chair of the 10th IEEE International Conference on Solid Dielectrics (ICSD) in Potsdam (2010) and chair of the 2nd International Conference on Electromechanically Active Polymers (EuroEAP) in Potsdam (2012). He was the vice president for technical activities of the IEEE Dielectrics and Electrical Insulation Society (DEIS) in 2007–2008 and 2014–2015. Since January 2018 he is serving as president of the IEEE Dielectrics & Electrical Insulation Society (DEIS).

His research portfolio includes polymer electrets with quasi-permanent space charge, ferro- or piezoelectrets (polymer films with electrically charged cavities), ferroelectric polymers with piezo- and pyroelectric properties, polymer composites with novel property combinations, physical mechanisms of dipole orientation and charge storage, electrically deformable dielectric elastomers (sometimes also called "electro-electrets"), as well as the physics of musical instruments.

Awards and honors
 Student fellowship of the Studienstiftung des Deutschen Volkes (1974–1979)
 ITG Award of the Informationstechnische Gesellschaft im VDE (1988)
 Silver medal as young scientist of the foundation Werner-von-Siemens-Ring (1989)
 Fellow of the Institute of Electrical and Electronics Engineers (IEEE) (1992) 
 Technology-Transfer Award of the Technologie-Stiftung Brandenburg (2001) 
 Fellow of the American Physical Society (APS) (2011) 
 Whitehead Memorial Lecture of the IEEE Conference on Electrical Insulation and Dielectric Phenomena (CEIDP) (2014)
 Bernhard Gross Memorial Lecture, 16th International Symposium on Electrets (ISE), Leuven, Belgium, September 2017

References

External links
 Homepage of the research group at the University of Potsdam

1952 births
Living people
Fellow Members of the IEEE
Fellows of the American Physical Society
20th-century German physicists
Academic staff of Jacobs University Bremen
Technische Universität Darmstadt alumni
Academic staff of Technische Universität Darmstadt
21st-century German physicists